Harvey Wright is a Scottish former rugby union player. He was the 113th President of the Scottish Rugby Union.

Rugby Union career

Amateur career

He played for and captained Dundee HSFP.

Provincial career

He played for Midlands District against North of Scotland District on 24 October 1964. The North won the match.

He was not selected for the subsequent North and Midlands match; but later he did go on to captain the side.

Administrative career

He became a selector for Midlands District in 1974.

Wright became President of Dundee HSFP. During the club's centenary year in 1980, Wright wrote in the centenary book that the Dundee club strived to play attractive open rugby.

Wright became the 113th President of the Scottish Rugby Union. He served the standard one year from 1999 to 2000.

Other interests

He played tennis and was a beaten finalist in the Midlands boys singles tournament at Broughty Ferry Games Club in 1955.

References

Scottish rugby union players
Presidents of the Scottish Rugby Union
Dundee HSFP players
Midlands District players
North and Midlands players
Rugby union number eights
People educated at the High School of Dundee